Església de Sant Corneli i Sant Cebrià d'Ordino  is a church located in Ordino, Andorra. It is a heritage property registered in the Cultural Heritage of Andorra.

References

Ordino
Roman Catholic churches in Andorra
Cultural Heritage of Andorra